The Enggano imperial pigeon (Ducula oenothorax) is a species of bird in the family Columbidae. It is endemic to the Enggano Island.

References

Ducula
Birds described in 1892
Birds of Indonesia
Taxa named by Tommaso Salvadori